Athlon Games Inc. is an American video game publisher owned by Leyou and based in Los Angeles, California. Best known for acquiring a controlling stake in the successor to Telltale Games, while also publishing SNK's weapon-based fighting game Samurai Shodown outside of Japan and China in 2019. The company is currently set to co-publish The Wolf Among Us 2 with Telltale.

History 
On May 24, 2018, it was announced by Chinese holding company Leyou that they had formed a new publishing division for PC and Consoles called Athlon Games, the company would be based in Los Angeles, California and would help co-publish games with other companies. In September 2018, Leyou had announced that they signed a deal with Middle-earth Enterprises to allow the company to develop and publish an online free-to-play game based on The Lord of the Rings. Amazon Game Studios (a division within Amazon) would join the project in July 2019, and would agree to co-develop and also publish the game globally, with Athlon set to publish the game in China and Taiwan. Later that year Athlon had announced that they had become the publisher of Samurai Shodown excluding in Japan and China, while also becoming a shareholder of LCG Entertainment, a company that had acquired the assets of Telltale Games, while also announcing that they'd become the future co-publisher of all upcoming Telltale titles, starting with the release of Batman: Shadows Edition in December 2019.  In December 2020, it was announced by Leyou that they'd be acquired by Tencent under their Image Frame Investment subsidiary. On April 17, 2021, after several years in development, Tencent and Amazon had announced that when they had been in contract negotiations for the planned The Lord of the Rings game, a dispute had begun between the two, ultimately causing Amazon to cancel the planned title.

Games

References

External links 
 Official website

2018 establishments in California
American companies established in 2018
American subsidiaries of foreign companies
Companies based in Los Angeles
Tencent
Video game companies based in California
Video game companies established in 2018